The 2018 Independence Cup, also known as Walton Independence Cup 2018 or Walton Independence Cup Football Tournament 2018 due to the sponsorship from Walton Group, was the 10th edition of the Independence Cup, the main domestic annual club football tournament organized by Bangladesh Football Federation. Thirteen participants competed in the tournament.

Arambagh KS was the winner of the previous edition, having defeated 2–0 Chittagong Abahani in the final of the tournament.

Venue

 All 22 matches were played at Bangabandhu National Stadium, Dhaka
 1, 4 and 7 December were played 1 match in a day of group stage.
 2, 3, 5, 6, 8 & 9 December were played 2 matches in a day of group stage.
 All matches were live telecast on Channel 9
 Co-sponsored by Progoti Life Insurance Company Limited, Marcel Fridge &

Prize money
 Champion got US$5960.
 Runners-up got US$3576.

Draw
The draw of the tournament was held 18:00 BST at BFF house Motijheel on 25 November 2018. The thirteen participants were divided into four groups. The top two teams from each group played Quarterfinals.

Group stage
 All matches were played in Dhaka.
 Times listed are UTC+06:00.

Group A

Group B

Group C

Group D

Knockout stage
 All matches are held at Dhaka
 Time listed UTC+6:00

Bracket

Quarterfinals

Semifinals

Final

Goalscorers

4 Goals
  Paul Emile Biyaga (Arambagh KS)

3 Goals
  Alisher Azizov (Sheikh Russel KC)
  Robiul Hasan (Arambagh KS)
  Mamadou Bah (Chittagong Abahani)

2 Goals
  Faisal Ahmed Shitol (Dhaka Abahani)
  Jamal Bhuyan (Saif Sporting Club)
  Motin Mia (Bashundhara Kings)
  Leonardo Vieira Lima (Brothers Union)
  Siyo Zunapio (Rahmatganj MFS)
  Kervens Belfort (Dhaka Abahani)
  Bakhtiyar Duyshobekov (Bashundhara Kings)
  Raphael Odovin (Sheikh Russel KC)

1 Goal
  Arifur Rahman (Arambagh KS)
  Faysal Ahmed (Rahmatganj MFS)
  Jamal Hossain (Rahmatganj MFS)
  Khandokar Ashraful Islam (NoFeL Sporting Club)
  Mannaf Rabby (Brothers Union)
  Mohammad Roman (NoFeL Sporting Club)
  Nasiruddin Chowdhury (Bashundhara Kings)
  Rakibul Islam (Rahmatganj MFS)
  Sujon Biswas (Muktijoddha Sangsad KC)
  Marcos Vinícius (Bashundhara Kings)
  Daniel Colindres (Bashundhara Kings)
  Yusuke Kato (Muktijoddha Sangsad KC)
  Mufta Lawal (Chittagong Abahani)
  Samson Iliasu (Team BJMC)
  Jack Daniels (Brothers Union)

See also
 Bangladesh Federation Cup

References

Independence Cup (Bangladesh)
2018 in Bangladeshi football
2018 Asian domestic association football cups